Exmoo News, formerly called Exmoo News Weekly, simply known as Exmoo, is a Chinese free newspaper  published daily in Macau, established on September 2, 2011.

Published in Chinese, Exmoo News is often regarded as a pro-establishment newspaper. It is produced and published by the Central International Communication Company Limited.

References

Newspapers published in Macau
2011 establishments in Macau